Wake Up is a 2015 Taiwanese television series starring Jag Huang, Wu Kang-jen, Hsu Wei-ning and Michael Huang. Filming began on 29 September 2014 and ended on 11 November. The series was aired on PTS HD from 1 April 2015. Wake Up is based on an original novel, Ferocious Pursuit (惡火追緝), by scriptwriter Huang Jian-ming.

Wake Up has earned praises from Hou Wen Yong, an anaesthesiologist and the author of renowned Taiwanese novel The Hospital. The drama won numerous awards at the 50th Golden Bell Awards, including Best Miniseries, Best Directing for a Miniseries, Best Writing for a Miniseries and Best Supporting Actor in a Miniseries for Wu Kang-jen. Leading Hong Kong newsweekly Yazhou Zhoukan placed the drama in the second spot for the 2015 Top Ten Television Dramas, after China's Nirvana in Fire.

Its sequel Wake Up 2 aired on PTS in Taiwan, premiering on September 9, 2017.

Synopsis 
When a patient died from a rare anaesthesia complication (malignant hyperthermia) during a medical operation led by the hospital’s Chief Physician Chen Hsien Rong (Michael Huang), anaesthesiologist Dr. Hsiao Zheng Xun (Jag Huang) was pressured to take the blame and suspended from duty. However, the insurance agent who handled the death claim, Yeh Jian De (Wu Kang-jen), discovered that there was more to the death cause and teamed up with Hsiao to investigate the situation. The medical operation also reunited Hsiao with his former schoolmate, Song Zhao Ying (Hsieh Ying-xuan) whom reminded Hsiao of his past trauma. A troubled Hsiao then approaches psychiatrist Yang Wei Yu (Hsu Wei-ning) to help him with psychology treatments. Facing pressure from the corrupted hospital system and his past trauma, would Hsiao fight for his conscience or would he give up and conform?

Cast

Main cast

Supporting cast

Guest cast

Soundtrack

Broadcast information

Ratings 
Wake Up received an average rating of 0.39 in the second season of PTS 2015 Television Programs Ratings Report.

Filming locations

Taiwan 

 Taoyuan General Hospital, Ministry of Health and Welfare
 New Taipei City Hospital
 Yilan County Government Police Bureau, Luodong Precinct
 Lanyang Museum
 Taipei Veterans General Hospital Su-Ao Branch
 Saint Mary's Hospital Luodong
 Lan-Yang Jen-Ai Hospital
 Health Center, Zhuangwei Township, Yilan County
 Health Center, Dongshan Township, Yilan County
 Yilan Wanshan Nursing Home
 Min-Sheng General Hospital, Lung-Tan
 Taiwan National Central Library
 Gloria Jean’s Coffee
 Xiao Xiang Ting Japanese Cuisine

Crew 
Anaesthesiologist Dr. Huang Ying Zhe was the medical adviser to the film.

 Executive Producer：Ding Shao Qing
 Director: Aozaru Shiao
 Assistant Director: Su Huang Ming
 Assistant to Director: Wang Yu Wen
 Script Supervisor：Zhao Zi Ling
 Project Supervisor：Jiang Feng Rong
 Administration Producer：Fu Kun Min
 Production Assistants: Chang Chih Jie, Wu Hsin Hsien
 Director of Photography：Chen Ko-Chin
 Editor: Gao Ming Cheng, Wang Jing Qiao
 Sound Advisor：Li Ming Jie
 Music Design：MUSDM
 Sound Effects：MUSDM
 Opener and Closing Design：Cheng Wei-Hao
 Assist in Shooting：Yilan County Government Cultural Affairs Bureau

References

External links 
 

2015 Taiwanese television series debuts
2015 Taiwanese television series endings
Public Television Service original programming
Taiwanese television series